Ching Chung or Tsing Chung is an at-grade MTR Light Rail stop located at Tsing Lun Road in Tuen Mun District, near Ching Chung Koon. It commenced on 24 September 1988 and belongs to Zone 3. It serves the Ching Chung Koon and Castle Peak Hospital. It is on routes 505, 615, and 615P.

See also

Ching Chung Koon

MTR Light Rail stops
Former Kowloon–Canton Railway stations
Tuen Mun District
Railway stations in Hong Kong opened in 1988